Banikhet was one of the 68 assembly constituencies of Himachal Pradesh a northern Indian state. Banikhet was also part of Kangra Lok Sabha constituency.

Member of Legislative Assembly
 1967: Des Raj, Indian National Congress
 1972: Des Raj, Indian National Congress
 1977: Gian Chand, Janata Party
 1982: Des Raj Mahajan, Indian National Congress
 1983: kishori Lal Vaidya, Bhartiya Janta Party.
 1985: Asha Kumari, Indian National Congress
 1990: Gandharv Singh, Bharatiya Janata Party
 1993: Asha Kumari, Indian National Congress
 1998: Asha Kumari, Indian National Congress
 2003: Asha Kumari, Indian National Congress
 2007: Renu Chadha, Bharatiya Janata Party

Election results

2007

See also

 Banikhet
 Chamba district
 Kangra (Lok Sabha constituency)

References

Chamba district
Former assembly constituencies of Himachal Pradesh